That's Him! is the second album by American jazz vocalist Abbey Lincoln featuring tracks recorded in 1957 for the Riverside label.

Reception

Allmusic awarded the album 4 stars stating "even this early, she was already a major jazz singer with a style of her own".

Track listing
 "Strong Man"  (Oscar Brown, Jr.) - 5:04     
 "Happiness Is a Thing Called Joe" (Harold Arlen, E.Y. "Yip" Harburg) - 5:57     
 "My Man" (Jacques Charles, Channing Pollack, Albert Willemetz, Maurice Yvain) - 3:57
 "Tender as a Rose"  (Phil Moore) - 3:00     
 "That's Him" (Ogden Nash, Kurt Weill) - 3:26     
 "I Must Have That Man!" (Dorothy Fields, Jimmy McHugh) - 4:00     
 "I Must Have That Man!" [take 3] (Fields, McHugh) - 3:56 Bonus track on CD reissue     
 "Porgy" (George Gershwin, Ira Gershwin, DuBose Heyward) - 4:27     
 "Porgy"  [take 1] (Gershwin, Gershwin, Hetward) - 4:30 Bonus track on CD reissue       
 "When a Woman Loves a Man" (Bernie Hanighen, Gordon Jenkins, Johnny Mercer) - 4:28     
 "Don't Explain" (Arthur Herzog, Jr., Billie Holiday) - 6:39

Personnel 
Abbey Lincoln - vocals
Kenny Dorham - trumpet 
Sonny Rollins - tenor saxophone
Wynton Kelly - piano (except "Don't Explain"); bass ("Don't Explain")
Paul Chambers - bass (except "Don't Explain")
Max Roach - drums

References 

1957 albums
Abbey Lincoln albums
Albums produced by Orrin Keepnews
Riverside Records albums